The Labour Contract Law of the People's Republic of China (《中华人民共和国劳动合同法》) is the primary source of labour law in China and went into effect on January 1, 2008, following a series of staff-sacking scandals in many companies. The Ministry of Human Resources and Social Security of the People's Republic of China is the responsible government department for administrating this law.

The Law 
While the enforcement of the law and its efficacity is sometimes questioned, the labor contract law promised to enable workers to get their employment granted only on basis of a contract, provide guidelines for standing working hour regulations of maximum 40 hours per week, non-tolerance for delayed payment of wages, relaxations in terms of paid leave etc.

Amendment 
The Standing Committee of the 11th National People's Congress adopted the decision on the Revision of the Labor Contract Law of the People's Republic of China ('Amendment'). The Amendment will take effect July 1, 2013, with the claimed intention to provide better protection to workers employed by labor dispatching agencies.

Highlighted requirements include:
Labor dispatch agency must have a minimum registered capital of no less than RMB 2,000,000;
 Operate from a permanent business premise with facilities that are suitable to conduct its business;
 have internal dispatch rules that are compliant with the relevant laws and administrative regulations;
 Satisfy other conditions as prescribed by laws and administrative regulations; and
 Apply for an administrative license and obtain approval from the relevant labor authorities.

All labor dispatch agencies established after July 1, 2013, will need to meet these new local labor law requirements before they can start the company registration process. Existing agencies that are already licensed have until July 1, 2014, to meet all local labor law requirements before renewing their business registration.

See also 
 Labour Law of the People's Republic of China

References

External links 
Text of the Labor Contract Law of the People's Republic of China includes supplementary materials
Labor Contract Law - The People's Republic of China Labor Contract Law Study Site in Chinese
China Enacts New Employment Law Affecting Employers Who Do Not Directly Employ Their Workers

Laws of China
Labor relations in China
Chinese labour law